The Reebok Nano was the first official athletic shoe specifically designed for CrossFit. The first generation of the shoe was released in 2011.

Product history

Reebok Nano

Reebok became the Official provider of licensed CrossFit footwear and apparel in 2011. During that year, Reebok released the first Reebok Nano. The shoe was designed to be used for high-impact movements, weightlifting, and short-distance running. The shoe's design includes a space toe box.

Reebok Nano 2.0
The following year, the Nano 2.0 was released. Men's Fitness included the shoe on its list of "Workout Gear for CrossFit: 15 New Products to Improve Your Daily Workout." The shoe has a wider toe box than the first generation to allow an athlete's foot to play more naturally and maximize stability.

Reebok Nano 3.0
Nano 3.0 was introduced in 2013. The shoe provides forefoot cushioning and heel stabilization with its dual-density platform. The shoe has a protective layer in its midsole to prevent fraying caused by rope climbs and features a wide toe box and midsole to provide stability during lifts. The Nano 3.0 also introduced the Dura-Cage construction for additional protection and lightweight support.

Reebok Nano 4.0
The fourth generation of the shoe was introduced during the 2014 CrossFit Games. The front of the shoe has a dura-cage protection layer and enhanced toe-wrap for durability. It also features a rigid sole that provides more grip and stability than previous Nano models.

Reebok Nano 5.0
The fifth generation of the shoe is wrapped in Kevlar.

Reebok Nano 6.0
Specifications:

 New DuPont™ Kevlar® infused mesh upper
 New anatomically secure fit
 Polyurethane Nano Shell for protection and support during heavy lifts
 New Kevlar fiber and Rope-Pro+ exterior material for greater grip on rope climbs
 Raised outsole lug patterns for better surface area contact and improved traction
 3MM heel pitch for improved stability during any WOD

Reebok Nano 7.0
Specifications:

 CrossFit / Weightlifting / Cross-training shoe - New for 2017
 Nano-Weave technology on the upper for comfort and breathability
 Anatomical toe box and a low-cut design for a natural feel and ankle mobility
 Ortho lite sock-liner for cushion
 360-degree TPU heel wrap for a locked-in feel
 Crystallized rubber outsole flexes naturally for balance and stability
 4MM heel pitch
 Anatomically secure fit

Reebok Nano 8.0
Specifications:

 CrossFit / Weightlifting / Cross-training shoe - New for 2018
 New Flex-weave Upper - Figure 8 construction for improved breathability, flexibility, and durability
 New Interior Bootie Construction for added comfort
 Strong Foundation with the wide, anatomical toe box
 Minimal heel pitch for secure footing
 Low-cut design for a natural feel and ankle mobility
 Rope-Pro tech for greater traction and protection on rope climbs

References

External links
 

CrossFit
Reebok brands